José Ignacio Florentín Bobadilla, known as José Florentín (born 5 July 1996) is a Paraguayan footballer, who plays for Vélez Sarsfield.

International career
He made his debut for the Paraguay national football team on 2 September 2021 in a World Cup qualifier against Ecuador, a 0–2 away loss. He substituted Richard Sánchez in the 85th minute.

References

External links
 
 

1996 births
Living people
Paraguayan footballers
Paraguayan expatriate footballers
People from Alto Paraná Department
Paraguay international footballers
Association football midfielders
Club Guaraní players
Club Atlético Vélez Sarsfield footballers
Paraguayan Primera División players
Argentine Primera División players
Paraguayan expatriate sportspeople in Argentina
Expatriate footballers in Argentina